Testud is a surname. Notable people with this surname include:

 Sandrine Testud (born 1972), French tennis player
 Sylvie Testud (born 1971), French actress, writer, and film director